Gaziler can refer to:

 Gaziler, Ilgaz
 Gaziler, Şenkaya
 Gaziler, Yığılca
 another name for Pyrogi